The Chinese Prime Minister is a 1974 American TV film. It was an episode of Hollywood Television Theatre on PBS.

It was based on a play by Enid Bagnold. This was presented on Broadway in 1965 with Edith Evans.

Plot
A 70 year old actress has retired from the stage but not life.

Cast
Judith Anderson as She
Richard Clarke as Tarver
Peter Coffield as Oliver
Kathleen Miller as Roxane

Reception
One review said "it just misses". The Los Angeles Times called it an "exquisite production".

References

External links
The Chinese Prime Minister at BFI

1974 films
1974 television films
American television films